Aralia dasyphylla is a species in the plant genus Aralia, family Araliaceae. Its native range is western Malesia (Java, Peninsular Malaysia and Sumatra). Some sources include Aralia dasyphylloides from southern China in this species.

References

dasyphylla
Flora of Malesia